The 1988 Grand Prix ČSSR was the sixth round of the 1988 World Sports-Prototype Championship season.  It took place at the Autodrom Brno, Czechoslovakia on July 10, 1988.

Official results
Class winners in bold.  Cars failing to complete 75% of the winner's distance marked as Not Classified (NC).

† - The #107 Chamberlain Engineering entry was disqualified for being pushed across the finish line at the end of the race.

Statistics
 Pole Position - #61 Team Sauber Mercedes - 1:46.440
 Fastest Lap - #61 Team Sauber Mercedes - 1:49.770
 Average Speed - 171.175 km/h

References

 
 

B
6 Hours of Brno
Brno 360